Nyakhane Nyakhane is a Mosotho footballer who currently plays as a midfielder for Likhopo Maseru. He has won three caps for the Lesotho national football team.

External links
 

Living people
Association football midfielders
Lesotho footballers
Lesotho international footballers
Year of birth missing (living people)